This article gives an overview of the shingle, strandline and sand-dune communities in the British National Vegetation Classification system.

Introduction

The shingle, strandline and sand-dune communities of the NVC were described in Volume 5 of British Plant Communities, first published in 2000, along with the other maritime communities (those of saltmarshes and maritime cliffs) and vegetation of open habitats.

In total, 19 shingle, strandline and sand-dune communities have been identified.

The shingle, strandline and sand-dune communities consist of a single community found on coastal shingle (SD1), two communities associated with strandlines (SD2 and SD3), and sixteen sand-dune communities.

The sand-dune communities fall into the following four groups:
 six foredune and mobile dune communities (SD4, SD5, SD6, SD7, SD10 and SD19)
 four fixed-dune grasslands (SD8, SD9, SD11 and SD12)
 five dune-slack communities (SD13, SD14, SD15, SD16 and SD17)
 one dune scrub community, SD18

Other communities occurring on sand-dunes

There are a number of other communities which occur on sand-dunes, but are not classified as sand-dune communities within the NVC. Those listed in British Plant Communities are as follows:

 Maritime cliff communities MC5 and MC6
 Open vegetation communities OV4 and OV27
 Mesotrophic grassland communities MG8, MG10 and MG11
 Swamp communities S4 and S19
 Mire communities M15 and M16
 Heath community H11

List of shingle, strandline and sand-dune communities

The following is a list of the communities that make up this category:

 SD1 Rumex crispus - Glaucium flavum shingle community
 SD2 Honkenya peploides - Cakile maritima strandline community
 SD3 Matricaria maritima - Galium aparine strandline community
 SD4 Elymus farctus ssp. boreali-atlanticus foredune community
 SD5 Leymus arenarius mobile dune community
 SD6 Ammophila arenaria mobile dune community
 SD7 Ammophila arenaria - Festuca rubra semi-fixed dune community
 SD8 Festuca rubra - Galium verum fixed dune grassland
 SD9 Ammophila arenaria - Arrhenatherum elatius dune grassland
 SD10 Carex arenaria dune community
 SD11 Carex arenaria - Cornicularia aculeata dune community
 SD12 Carex arenaria - Festuca ovina - Agrostis capillaris dune grassland
 SD13 Sagina nodosa - Bryum pseudotriquetrum dune-slack community
 SD14 Salix repens - Campylium stellatum dune-slack community
 SD15 Salix repens - Calliergon cuspidatum dune-slack community
 SD16 Salix repens - Holcus lanatus dune-slack community
 SD17 Potentilla anserina - Carex nigra dune-slack community
 SD18 Hippophae rhamnoides dune scrub
 SD19 Phleum arenarium - Arenaria serpyllifolia dune annual community Tortulo-Phleetum arenariae (Massart 1908) Br.-Bl. & de Leeuw 1936